In economics, testing for an asymmetric cointegration relationship among variables implies distinguishing the positive and the negative effects of the error obtained from the cointegration regression. In order to do that, economists usually use the asymmetric cointegration framework proposed by Enders and Siklos in 2001. Asymmetric cointegration comes from the analysis of multivariate combinations arising from the decomposition of the series into positive and negative values of its cumulative sums; see Lardic and Mignon (2008, p. 484).

According to Cook (2006), testing for a potential asymmetric cointegration extends the analysis in further directions to allow for a possibility that other standard cointegration tests may fail to detect an underlying cointegration relationship and therefore, the threshold autoregressive and momentum-threshold cointegration tests are applied to investigate the hypothesis that the cointegration relationship between banking sector development indicators and remittances is of an asymmetric form which splits the speed of adjustments into two parts based on the direction of the equilibrium error.

References

Statistical hypothesis testing